The Regret Stakes is an American Thoroughbred horse race run annually at Monmouth Park Racetrack in Oceanport, New Jersey. First run in 1949, it is open to fillies and mares, age three and older. It is contested on dirt at a distance of six furlongs.

Prominent earlier winners include Primonetta (1962), Ta Wee (1970), Candy Éclair (1980), and Lady's Secret (1985).

Records
Speed record:
 1:08.37 - Stonetastic (2016)

Most wins:
 2 - Cinda (1952, 1953)
 2 - Geeky Gorgeous (2013, 2014)
 2 - Bronx Beauty (2019, 2020)

Most wins by a jockey:
 ? - 

Most wins by a trainer:
 ? - 

Most wins by an owner:
 ? -

Winners since 2000

Horse races in New Jersey
Ungraded stakes races in the United States
Open sprint category horse races
Recurring sporting events established in 1949
Monmouth Park Racetrack